KWDW-LP (93.9 FM) is a low-power FM radio station licensed to Oklahoma City, Oklahoma, United States. The station is currently owned by Jesuristo Es Mi Fortaleza Church Inc.

History
The callsign was KWDW-LP on April 3, 2014.

References

External links

WDW-LP
WDW-LP
Radio stations in Oklahoma City
Spanish-language radio stations in Oklahoma
2014 establishments in Oklahoma
Radio stations established in 2014